The Roman Catholic Diocese of Kigoma is a diocese located in Kigoma in the Ecclesiastical province of Tabora in Tanzania. Because of the appointment of Bishop Protase Rugambwa as an Archbishop ad personam (given the personal title of archbishop with the position of Deputy Secretary of the Congregation for the Evangelization of Peoples and  President of the Pontifical Mission Societies) by Pope Benedict XVI on Tuesday, June 26, 2012, the Diocese became a vacant see (sede vacante).

History
 27 September 1880: Established as the Apostolic Vicariate of Tanganyika from the Apostolic Vicariate of Central Africa in Sudan
 10 May 1946: Renamed as Apostolic Vicariate of Kigoma
 25 March 1953: Promoted as the Diocese of Kigoma

Leadership
 Vicars Apostolic of Tanganika (Latin rite)
 Jean-Baptiste-Frézal Charbonnier, M. Afr. (1887.01.14 – 1888.03.16)
 Léonce Bridoux, M. Afr. (1888.06.15 – 1890.10.21)
 Adolphe Lechaptois, M. Afr. (1891.06.19 – 1917.11.30)
 Joseph-Marie Birraux, M. Afr. (1920.04.22 – 1936.04.22)
 John van Sambeek, M. Afr. (1936.11.19 – 1946.05.10 see below)
 Vicar Apostolic of Kigoma (Latin rite)
 John van Sambeek, M. Afr. (see above 1946.05.10 – 1953.03.25 see below)
 Bishops of Kigoma (Latin rite)
 John van Sambeek, M. Afr. (see above 1953.03.25 – 1957.11.22)
 James Holmes-Siedle, M. Afr. (1958.08.05 – 1969.12.15)
 Alphonse Daniel Nsabi (1969.12.15 – 1989.08.16)
 Paul R. Ruzoka (1989.11.10 – 2006.11.25); named Archbishop of the Roman Catholic Archdiocese of Tabora
 Protase Rugambwa (2008.01.18 - 2012.06.26); named Archbishop (President of the Pontifical Mission Societies and Adjunct Secretary of the Congregation for the Evangelization of Peoples)
 Joseph P. Mlola, ALCP/OSS, (2014.07.10 - present)

See also
Roman Catholicism in Tanzania

References

Sources
 GCatholic.org
 Catholic Hierarchy

Kigoma
Kigoma
Kigoma
Kigoma, Roman Catholic Diocese of